Live at Ethell's is a live album by saxophonist Clifford Jordan which was recorded in Baltimore in 1987 and released on the Mapleshade label.

Reception

The AllMusic review by Scott Yanow called it, "Excellent advanced straight-ahead jazz from an underrated great".

Track listing

Personnel
Clifford Jordan – tenor saxophone
Kevin O'Connell – piano
Ed Howard – bass
Vernel Fournier – drums

References

Clifford Jordan live albums
1990 live albums
Mapleshade Records live albums